Newtrament is a musician, MC and DJ known for releasing an early UK electro/hip hop record - "London Bridge is Falling Down" - on Jive Records. It was based on the nursery rhyme (previously adapted by the reggae group Culture) with a political message that electoral politics were a sham.

Discography
"London Bridge Is Falling Down" (Jive Records), 12", 1983

References

External links 
Discogs entry
Ladbroke Grove Krew and Wild Bunch Bristol connection

British hip hop DJs
British electronic musicians